Niz Bahjani, also spelled as Nij Bahjani, is a census village in Nalbari district, Assam, India. According to the 2011 Census of India, the village Niz Bahjani village has a total population of 5,183 people including 2,714 males and 2,469 females with a literacy rate of 78.41%.

References 

Villages in Nalbari district